Bundevara is a type of pastry in Serbian cuisine and of other parts of former Yugoslavia. It is a sweet pie made of rolled phyllo, similar to strudel, filled with sweetened grated pumpkin pulp and baked in an oven. Occasionally nutmeg, cinnamon or similar spices may be added, or raisins or grated lemon rinds. It is usually dusted with icing sugar and/or vanilla sugar, and is served hot or cold. The pumpkins (or squashes) with more intense coloured pulp (richer in carotene) are more appreciated. So, although little grown in Serbia, some varieties of Cucurbita moschata are suited for this dish.

See also
 List of pies
 List of squash and pumpkin dishes
 Pumpkin pie

References

Serbian cuisine
Squash and pumpkin dishes
Sweet pies